Howard Rubenstein may refer to:

 Howard J. Rubenstein (1932-2020), American lawyer and public relations expert
 Howard Rubenstein (physician) (born 1931), American physician, playwright and translator